Mikhail Grigorevich Kravets (born November 12, 1963) is a Russian former professional ice hockey player who played in the Soviet Hockey League and 2 games in the National Hockey League (NHL). He is currently serving as the Head Coach of HC Vityaz of the Kontinental Hockey League (KHL).  

He played for the SKA St. Petersburg and San Jose Sharks, as well as a season on loan to the Manitoba Moose from the Detroit Vipers in 1995. In the years he was playing for the Sharks, he played in every game of the season, but in 2000 missed his third season's opening due to being denied a visa to the United States.

During the 2012-13 season, Kravets was named interim head coach from November until December for SKA St. Petersburg before returning to his assistant coaching duties.

Career statistics

References

External links

1963 births
Living people
Arkansas RiverBlades players
Baton Rouge Kingfish players
Detroit Vipers players
Kansas City Blades players
Jewish ice hockey players
Louisiana IceGators (ECHL) players
Milwaukee Admirals players
Minnesota Moose players
Mississippi Sea Wolves players
New Orleans Brass players
San Jose Sharks draft picks
San Jose Sharks players
SKA Saint Petersburg players
Soviet ice hockey players
Ice hockey people from Saint Petersburg
Wichita Thunder players